Thomas Alexander Bisset (born 21 March 1932) is an English former professional footballer who made 115 Football League appearances playing as a forward or right back for Brighton & Hove Albion.

Life and career
Bisset was born in Croydon, Surrey. After completing his National Service obligationswhile serving with the Royal Signals in Eritrea, he played football for the Eritrean League against the Sudan national teamhe joined Redhill of the Athenian League before signing for Brighton & Hove Albion in late 1952. He played little for his first two-and-a-half seasons, then converted from forward to right backmissed only three matches in the 1955–56 campaign, before returning to the reserves for another two years. Having made little contribution to the team's promotion from the Third Division South, he made more than 50 appearances in Brighton's first two seasons in the Second Division, before returning to the reserves again before his release in 1961. He then moved into non-league football with Guildford City and Yiewsley of the Southern League and then Sussex County League clubs Haywards Heath Town (as player-coach) and Southwick.

References

1932 births
Possibly living people
Footballers from Croydon
English footballers
Association football fullbacks
Redhill F.C. players
Brighton & Hove Albion F.C. players
Guildford City F.C. players
Hillingdon Borough F.C. players
Haywards Heath Town F.C. players
Southwick F.C. players
English Football League players
Southern Football League players
20th-century British Army personnel
Royal Corps of Signals soldiers